Annandale's rat (Sundamys annandalei) is a species of rodent in the family Muridae.
It is found in Indonesia (Sumatra), Peninsular Malaysia, and Singapore. It was classified as Rattus annandalei until 2017, but mitochondrial and nuclear DNA show that it belongs to the rat genus Sundamys.

References

External links
Annandale's Rat

Sundamys
Rats of Asia
Rodents of Singapore
Rodents of Indonesia
Rodents of Malaysia
Mammals described in 1903
Taxa named by J. Lewis Bonhote
Taxonomy articles created by Polbot
Taxobox binomials not recognized by IUCN